Saskatoon Stonebridge-Dakota is a provincial electoral district for the Legislative Assembly of Saskatchewan, Canada. It was first contested in the 2016 election.

Geography 
The district includes the Saskatoon neighbourhood of Stonebridge.

Members of the Legislative Assembly

Election results

References

Saskatchewan provincial electoral districts
Politics of Saskatoon